The 2002-03 Brown Bears women's ice hockey team represented Brown University.

Regular season
Jessica Link led the Bears in scoring with 39 points (20 goals and 19 assists). Link's 20 goals led the team and her 19 assists were good enough for third overall. Link tied for the ECAC lead in short-handed points with three. After two seasons, Link climbed to 24th on Brown's all-time scoring list.

Skaters

Goaltenders

Awards and honors
Jessica Link, Second Team All-ECAC
 Jessica Link, All-Ivy Honorable Mention honors
 Jessica Link, ECAC Player of the Week on 1/14.

References

External links
Official site

Brown Bears women's ice hockey seasons
Brown
Brown
Brown